Masdevallia, abbreviated Masd in horticultural trade, is a large genus of flowering plants of the Pleurothallidinae, a subtribe of the orchid family (Orchidaceae). There are over 500 species, grouped into several subgenera. The genus is named for Jose Masdevall (?-1801), a physician and botanist in the court of Charles III of Spain.

Range and morphology 
These plants are found from Mexico to southern Brazil, but mostly in the higher regions (2,500-4,000 m ASL) of the Andes of Ecuador and Colombia, Peru and Bolivia. They may be epiphytes,  terrestrials or growing as lithophytes on damp rocks.

The plants are characterized by an abbreviated to elongate and creeping rhizome that gives rise to stems that lack pseudobulbs. The stem bears a single, fleshy, erect to pendent, ovate to lanceolate leaf. The flowers are triangular and occur singly or in racemose inflorescences. They are characterized by a showy calyx and reduced corolla. The sepals are fused at the base and frequently caudate. The petals flank the semiterete column and the tongue-shaped lip is flexibly hinged to a free column foot.

Cultivation 
The species are sensitive to inappropriate cultural conditions and will show signs of stress by leaf spotting or dropping. They can generally be grown in pots with sphagnum or seedling grade wood chips although a few species produce descending inflorescences and are best accommodated in baskets. In both cases the rhizome should remain at the surface of the medium in order to prevent rot.

Most of these plants are from high altitude cloud forests and require very cool conditions and abundant moisture throughout the year.  They cannot tolerate dryness, low humidity, or excessive temperatures and the plants are very easy to kill.  They will simply drop all their leaves and suddenly collapse if allowed to dry completely or are exposed to high temperatures.  Many members of this genus from very high altitude cloud forests defy cultivation.   Most of the species from this genus are considered less difficult in cultivation than plants from the genus Dracula, and some of them are very easy to cultivate and have a 'weedy' habit such as Veitch's masdevallia, but the majority of these species are usually very difficult to maintain in cultivation unless the plants can be kept cool and moist all the time.

Low humidity conditions or watering the plants with a water source which contains high levels of dissolved salts will result in the leaves yellowing and rapidly dying from the tips back to the rhizome.  The plants should be provided with rain water or distilled water or a very pure water source.  The medium should always remain moist as the plants do not have any significant storage structures like most orchids.

Selected species 

 Masdevallia antonii
 Masdevallia davisii – Davis' masdevallia, orchid of the sun, qoriwaqanki (Quechua)
 Masdevallia pinocchio
 Masdevallia unguentum
 Masdevallia veitchiana – Veitch's masdevallia, king of the masdevallias, gallo-gallo (Spanish), waqanki (Quechua)

Taxonomy 
Masdevallia was found to be polyphyletic  and the taxonomy of the group is unresolved but the currently accepted taxonomy proceeds as follows:

Subgenera 

 Subgenus Amanda (≡Spilotantha)
 Section Amandae: 28+ species, e.g. M. amanda, M. bulbophyllopsis, M. melanopus, M. polysticta. Separated in Spilotantha.
 Section Ophioglossae: 1-2 species – M. ophioglossa, M. ophioglossa ssp. grossa
 Subgenus Cucullatia: (≡Megema)4 species – M. cerastes, M. corniculata, M. cucullata, M. macrura
 Subgenus Fissia: (≡Fissia) 3 species – M. mutica, M. picturata, M. pleurothalloides
 Subgenus Masdevallia
 Section Amaluzae: (≡Luzama) 6 species, e.g. M. amaluzae, M. carmenensis, M. patula
 Section Aphanes: (≡Pteroon) 3 species – M. aphanes, M. capillaris, M. scopaea
 Section Coriaceae :
 Subsection Coriaceae: (≡Byrsella) ~35 species, e.g. M. angulata, M. caesia, M. civilis, M. elephanticeps, M. foetens, M. fractiflexa
 Subsection Durae: (≡Regalia) 4 species – M. ayabacana, M. dura, M. panguiensis, M. utriculata
 Section Ligiae: Monotypic – M. ligiae
 Section Masdevallia:
 Subsection Caudatae: ~28 species, e.g. M. bottae, M. caudata, M. decumana, M. lychniphora, M. triangularis, M. xanthina
 Subsection Coccineae: 12 species, e.g. M. amabilis, M. barlaeana, M. coccinea, M. ignea, M. veitchiana
 Subsection Masdevallia: ~58 species, e.g. M. agaster, M. calocodon, M. mejiana, M. pumila, M. uniflora
 Subsection Oscillantes: ~11 species, e.g. M. andreettana, M. wageneriana (including M. pteroglossa)
 Subsection Saltatrices: 14 species, e.g. M. angulifera, M. constricta, M. limax, M. saltatrix, M. urosalpinx, M. ventricularia
 Subsection Tubulosae: 7 species, e.g. M. bangii, M. irapana, M. tubulosa
 Section Mentosae: Monotypic – M. mentosa
 Section Minutae: ~21 species, e.g. M. floribunda, M. herradurae, M. minuta, M. nicaraguae, M. wendlandiana
 Section Racemosae: (≡Spectaculum) Monotypic – M. racemosa
 Section Reichenbachianae:
 Subsection Dentatae : (≡Petalodon) 2 species – M. collina, M. macrogenia
 Subsection Reichenbachianae: (≡Reichantha) ~11 species, e.g. M. rolfeana, M. schroderiana, M. striatella
 Subgenus Meleagris: (≡Rodrigoa) 7 species, e.g. M. anisomorpha, M. heteroptera, M. meleagris
 Subgenus Nidifica: (≡Buccella) 4-5 species: e.g. M. dynastes, M. nidifica (including M. ventricosa)
 Subgenus Polyantha (≡Alaticaulia)
 Section Alaticaules: 97 species, e.g. M. bicolor, M. infracta, M. scobina, M. stenorrhynchos, M. tovarensis, M. vargasii, M. weberbaueri
 Section Polyanthae: 7 species, e.g. M. discoidea, M. lata, M. polyantha, M. schlimii
 Subgenus Scabripes (≡Portilla)
 Subgenus Volvula (≡Streptoura)

Footnotes 
  (2005): Masdevallias, Gems of the Orchid World. Timber Press.
 : Icones Pleurothallidinarum, Systematics of Masdevallia (multiple volumes). Missouri Botanical Garden Press. (1984–2003)
  (2001): Phylogenetic relationships in Pleurothallidinae (Orchidaceae): combined evidence from nuclear and plastid DNA sequences. American Journal of Botany 88: 2286-2308.

References

External links 
 
 
 Image gallery
 Ron Parsons Flowershots Masdevallia Species
 Masdevallia species and hybrids catalog with images 

 
Epiphytic orchids
Pleurothallidinae genera